Doris Egbring-Kahn (1926–2016) was a German actress.

She started her career in 1934 at the Städtische Oper Berlin. In Life Sucks, a 2008 film by Rudolf Steiner, Doris Egbring-Kahn plays the Grandma.

References

External links
 
 Biography Zeitgenössische Oper Berlin 

1926 births
2016 deaths
German film actresses
German television actresses
People from Münster